Teashark is a discontinued mobile browser. It worked in concert with the Teashark servers, which transcoded (and partly pre-rendered) websites before sending the results to the mobile device.

References

Web browsers
Java device platform
Java platform software
Mobile web browsers
Software based on WebKit
Discontinued web browsers